Samantha "Sam" Grey (born 19 March 1984 in Liverpool) is an English actress, most notable for her role as Health Care Assistant Alice Chantrey on Casualty. She first appeared as Alice on the first of April 2006 in the episode "Going Under". She has also starred as Jessica in Dream Team episode "War of the Roses" and Polly in Flood as well as the 2005 music video for "All I'm made of".

Sam has been a model since the age of 15 and has modelled for names such as Burberry, Mulberry, and Emporiana, as well as in fashion magazines such as Vogue, Elle, New Woman and Tatler.

Filmography

References

External links 
 

Living people
English television actresses
English female models
Actresses from Liverpool
1984 births
Models from Merseyside